"Christmas Eve/Sarajevo 12/24" is an instrumental medley of "God Rest Ye Merry, Gentlemen" and "Shchedryk", first released on the Savatage album Dead Winter Dead in 1995 as "Christmas Eve (Sarajevo 12/24)." It was re-released by the Trans-Siberian Orchestra, a side project of several Savatage members, on their 1996 debut album Christmas Eve and Other Stories.  The piece describes a lone cello player (based on Vedran Smailović) playing a forgotten Christmas carol in war-torn Sarajevo.

Composition 

"Christmas Eve/Sarajevo 12/24" consists of four sections, alternating between soft and loud, as well as between the two component pieces in the medley. Part one consists of "God Rest Ye Merry, Gentlemen" performed on a cello, accompanied only by a picked electric guitar and a flute in round. After a short ritard, part two abruptly begins, with "Shchedryk" (recognizable in the English-speaking world as the melody from "Carol of the Bells") being played at full volume, full orchestration and the synthesizers and electric guitars taking lead melody. The time signature also abruptly shifts from cut time to a driving triple meter, which persists through the rest of the piece.

After a short transition, the third section consists of a piano solo, featuring motifs from both melodies being played simultaneously, with light string backing that builds through the section. The transition to the fourth and final section is again abrupt; the final section closely resembles the second, with "Shchedryk" being the central melody, again led by guitar and synthesizer with piano added. The coda consists of backing strings continuing softly after the fourth section ends, fading to a close.

Both of the tunes used in "Christmas Eve/Sarajevo 12/24" were in the public domain in 1995: "Shchedryk" was released in 1918 (although the English lyrics to "Carol of the Bells," dating to 1936, were still under copyright and were not included in the recording), while "God Rest Ye Merry, Gentlemen" dated back several centuries.

Background and writing 
Paul O'Neill explained the story behind "Christmas Eve/Sarajevo 12/24" in an interview published on ChristianityToday.com:

The story is a slightly altered version of the real-life story of Vedran Smailović. Despite O'Neill's description of Smailović as "white-haired", he was only 36 years old during his 22-day vigil. Smailović did not actually play any Mozart or Beethoven pieces, but he did play Remo Giazotto's "Adagio in G minor" each day among the bombed ruins of Sarajevo in honor of each person killed in the bombing. He was not the only cellist who played through the siege; the Sarajevo String Quartet, which did have elderly members, were also noted for their continuous performances throughout the siege.

Chart performance and sales 

On the week ending January 6, 1996, "Christmas Eve (Sarajevo 12/24)" (with the artist listed as "Savatage") both debuted and peaked at No. 34 on Billboard's Hot Adult Contemporary Track Chart. With the artist name changed to Trans-Siberian Orchestra, the song charted on the Billboard Hot 100 again in the first weeks of January 1997 and January 1998, peaking at No. 49 both times.  The song also charted on Billboard's Hot Mainstream Rock Tracks chart on the week ending January 3, 1998, peaking at No. 29.

As of November 25, 2016, total sales of the digital track stand at 1,300,000 downloads according to Nielsen SoundScan, placing it third on the list of all-time best-selling Christmas/holiday digital singles in SoundScan history, falling short only to Mariah Carey's "All I Want for Christmas Is You" and the song "Do You Want to Build a Snowman?" from the movie Frozen.

References 

 Trans-Siberian Orchestra official website
 CD jacket of Christmas Eve and Other Stories

1995 singles
Atlantic Records singles
Lava Records singles
Music medleys
Rock instrumentals
Savatage
Trans-Siberian Orchestra songs
Warner Music Group singles
1990s instrumentals
Christmas songs